The Padre Nazario School is a historic public school in Guayanilla, Puerto Rico. Completed in 1926, it epitomizes the monumental schools built in Puerto Rico during the early 20th century. Its Neoclassical and Spanish Revival details at the entry and spatial sequence of the vestibule are exceptional design features. It is named for José María Nazario y Cancel, a long-serving and prominent priest of the Guayanilla parish and discoverer of the Nazario Collection of ancient carved stones.

The school was entered on the National Register of Historic Places in 2012.

See also
National Register of Historic Places listings in southern Puerto Rico

References

External links

School buildings on the National Register of Historic Places in Puerto Rico
School buildings completed in 1926
1926 establishments in Puerto Rico
Neoclassical architecture in Puerto Rico
Spanish Colonial Revival architecture in Puerto Rico
Guayanilla, Puerto Rico